Amarna Tomb 5 is an ancient sepulchre in Amarna, Upper Egypt. It was built for the courtier Pentu, and is one of the six Northern tombs at Amarna. The burial is located to the south of the tomb of Meryra. It is very similar to the tomb of Ahmes. The sepulchre is T-shaped and its inner chamber would have served as the burial chamber.

Penthu served at court during the 18th Dynasty reign of the Pharaoh Akhenaten. Pentu held the titles of sealbearer of the King of Lower Egypt, the sole companion, the attendant of the Lord of the Two Lands, the favorite of the good god, king's scribe, the king's subordinate, First servant of the Aten in the mansion of the Aten in Akhetaten, Chief of physicians, chamberlain.

The tomb is decorated and scenes include a visit from the royal family to the temple and a reward scene.

North Wall: The royal family is shown entering the temple. Akhenaten and Nefertiti are accompanied by three of their daughters: Meritaten, Meketaten and most likely Ankhesenpaaten.

On the same wall the royal family is depicted rewarding Penthu at the temple. Akhenaten is shown wearing the read crown and Nefertiti stands behind him (the upper half of her body is damaged). Behind the royal couple we see three princesses accompanied by their nurses.

On the South Wall Penthu is depicted in another award scene but this one takes place at the palace. 
In an associated scene the king and queen are shown having a meal. Akhenaten is shown wearing a khat headdress. He is seated and is eating fowl. Nefertiti is seated behind him, wearing her blue crown and seems to be drinking from a cup.

References

Amarna tombs